The New Jersey Youth Symphony (NJYS) is a non-profit organization based in New Providence, New Jersey.  Founded in 1979, it provides young instrumentalists from all around New Jersey with music performance and educational experiences.  There are three string ensembles, three full symphony orchestras, three flute ensembles, chamber music programs, music theory classes presented in accordance with the Associated Board of the Royal Schools of Music (UK), a summer camp, and other various outreach activities. It operates under auspices the Wharton Institute of the Performing Arts. The symphony performs regularly in the United States and Europe. Helen Cha-Pyo has Artistic Director of the Wharton Institute for the Performing Arts and Conductor of the Youth Symphony since July 2018.

History 
The New Jersey Youth Symphony was founded by Jane Donnelly, Anne Shuhan, other interested central New Jersey parents, and the administration of the New Jersey Symphony Orchestra (NJSO), the state's oldest professional orchestra. The NJSO provided its Assistant Conductor, George Marriner Maull, to serve as Conductor of the NJYS. During the first year, Maull led a group of 65 high school-aged students, and in 1980 he was named the orchestra's Music Director.

In 1980 the organization became an independent 501(c)(3) not for profit corporation. As the scope of the enterprise grew, the NJYS Board of Trustees hired Barbara Barstow to create new ensembles, the first of which was the Preparatory Orchestra, now known as the Youth Orchestra (YO). In 1983, she developed the Orchestral String Training Ensemble (OSTE) for younger string players who had not participated in an orchestra before.

In 1997, George Marriner Maull resigned in order to devote more time to his other conducting post, the Philharmonic Orchestra of New Jersey, now called The Discovery Orchestra (TDO). In recognition of his 18-year tenure, Maull was named NJYS Conductor Laureate. He was succeeded first by conductor Adrian Bryttan and later by Paul Hostetter. The Youth Symphony is currently led by Helen Cha-Pyo.

In 2001, Barstow was named Artistic Director of the New Jersey Youth Symphony, Inc., to guide and oversee the entire NJYS entity. She also served as Conductor of Youth Orchestra, Junior Strings and the Orchestral String Training Ensemble. In the fall of 2007, Barstow announced her retirement from the organization in 2008.

NJYS is the only youth orchestra program in the New York metropolitan area that has its own permanent facility for orchestra and small ensemble rehearsals, as well as classroom spaces. The NJYS, Inc. has been administratively led by two Executive Directors: Linda Abrams (1984–2004) and presently Linda Onorevole.

The Youth Symphony has toured Europe six times and has performed at Carnegie Hall, Lincoln Center and the New Jersey Performing Arts Center on a number of occasions. The group has performed at the European Youth Music Festival in Belgium, Smetana Hall in Prague, and Musikverein in Vienna.

Ensembles 
The ensembles of the New Jersey Youth Symphony (youngest to oldest):

Primo Strings : Beginning String Ensemble for students in grades 3-5
Concertino Strings : Secondary String Ensemble for students in grades 5-7
Sinfonia : Advanced String Ensemble for students in grades 5-8
CWE : Concertino Wind Ensemble for students in grades 5-8
Flute Choir, Flute Forum and Fortissimo Flutes
Philharmonia : Beginning Full Orchestra for students in grades 6-9
Youth Orchestra : Full orchestra for students in grades 7-12
Youth Symphony : Advanced Full Orchestra for high school aged students 9-12
Conducted by Helen Cha-Pyo and regularly performs at Rutgers University, Bergen PAC, NJPAC and Carnegie Hall. Tours international destinations including Italy and Vienna every three years during the summer.

Other Ensembles/Programs
Fall Chamber Music : For NJYS members 
Performs at NJYS Music Center, Master Class Programs, Local chamber programs, nursing homes, schools, and other venues
Music Theory/Musicianship Training 
Summer Camp : For Middle School aged students either currently in NJYS or not in the organization who are accepted by audition, includes 10½ days of intense study all day
Programs : Camp Orchestra, Chamber Orchestras, Chamber Ensembles, Private Lessons, Camp Choir, Tennis, and fun competitions and 2 Performances - Chamber Music and Full Concert

Play-a-thon 

Every year, the orchestra holds a fundraiser performance at the Jersey Gardens Mall in Elizabeth, New Jersey with all of the 550 members of the organization. This light pops concert is the largest youth symphony performance in the world. The orchestra plays popular movie music from The Lord of the Rings, Star Wars, Pirates of the Caribbean, and more. In recent years members of the audience have had the opportunity to participate in an auction to win the chance to conduct the orchestra through Stars and Stripes Forever by John Philip Sousa.

External links 
New Jersey Youth Symphony

References 

American youth orchestras
Union County, New Jersey
Musical groups established in 1979
1979 establishments in New Jersey
Youth organizations based in New Jersey
Orchestras based in New Jersey